Akira Takeuchi may refer to:

}, Japanese Olympic athlete
, Japanese fashion designer, founded the Theatre Products brand
, Japanese footballer